Germantown is a city in Shelby County, Tennessee, United States. The population was 41,333 at the 2020 census.

Germantown is a suburb of Memphis, bordering it to the east-southeast. Germantown was founded in 1841 by mostly German emigrants. The town hosts Festivals year round to celebrate their history and German Culture. In the city center is the "Old Germantown" neighborhood, anchored by a railroad depot (a 1948 reproduction of the 1868 original) and railroad tracks that recall the community's earliest days of development as an outpost along the Memphis and Charleston Railroad.

The city hosts many horse shows and competitions annually, most notably the Germantown Charity Horse Show in June. Other major annual events include the Germantown Festival, an arts and crafts fair, in early September.

Germantown has the lowest crime rate for any city its size in the State of Tennessee and the police and fire departments have average emergency response time of five minutes (police just under 4 minutes & fire department 5.2 minutes). The parks and recreation department is nationally accredited. The Arbor Day Foundation has designated Germantown a "Tree City USA" for 23 consecutive years. Only 3.2% of Germantown citizens are below the poverty line.

Geography
Germantown is located at  (35.089023, −89.793997).  It is part of the Memphis metropolitan area.

History

Germantown was founded along the Chickasaw Trace on a ridge between the Wolf River and Nonconnah Creek, about 16 miles east of the Mississippi River.

The first settlers arrived in Germantown about 1825. Between 1825 and 1830, Miss Frances Wright established Nashoba Plantation, a utopian community intended to educate emancipated slaves and teach them a trade. By 1830, the first store was opened as more settlers moved into the area.

The community became known as Pea Ridge in 1833. Town lots were laid out in 1834 by surveyor N. T. German. The name was changed to Germantown in 1836. This coincidentally also reflected the settling of German families.

The town was incorporated in 1841. The Memphis-Charleston Railroad was built through the community in 1852. Germantown experienced setbacks through the period of the Civil War (1861-1865); the yellow fever epidemics reduced its population to a few hundred.

The town rebounded slowly. Churches destroyed in the war were rebuilt, schools were constructed and the population began to return around the turn of the century. The city name was briefly changed to Neshoba, a Chickasaw word meaning 'wolf', during World War I, because of widespread anti-German sentiment in the United States at that time.

During the twentieth century, the community derived its strength through involvement of citizens, as evidenced in the churches, garden clubs and civic organizations. The Poplar Pike Improvement Association and the Germantown Civic Club played vital roles in the physical and social development of the community.

In the last half of the century, after WWII the population grew from about 400 to more than 40,000. Over several decades, elected and civic leadership, with support of citizens, worked proactively to control suburban growth through development regulations, aesthetic controls and strategic planning efforts.

Historical Sites 

"Old Germantown" is centered around the railroad depot in downtown Germantown on Germantown Road. This was chosen as a central location by settlers in the late 19th century due to its high ground and central location. The depot was rebuilt in 1948 to replace the original structure from 1868. The depot is now home to the Germantown Train Museum. There are signs to commemorate historical sites and parks in "Old Germantown."

Fort Germantown, located on Honey Tree Drive off of Poplar Pike is listed in the National Register of Historic Places. It was at this site that 250 Union Soldiers built their fortification from the ground in order to guard the Memphis and Charleston railroad during the Civil War. Now, there are replicas of Howitzer cannons to mark the fort.

The John Gray House, located in Municipal Park, built prior to 1851 is one of the oldest brick homes in Shelby County. Originally located in Eads, TN, it was moved to Germantown in 1989 to prevent demolition.

Government

The City of Germantown operates under a Mayor-Alderman form of government. The mayor and five aldermen are elected for four year terms and are part-time positions. The Board of Mayor and Aldermen is the legislative and policy-making body of the city. The mayor does not vote except to break a tie. By charter, the mayor is the chief administrative officer; however, oversight of day-to-day management is assigned to a professional city administrator, appointed by the mayor but subject to board approval. Mike Palazzolo was elected as Mayor in November 2015 and re-elected in 2018.

More than 200 citizens annually volunteer their time, expertise and energy in service on the city's 20-plus advisory commissions and boards. Most appointments, made by the mayor and aldermen each December, are for one year terms; most groups meet monthly. Their responsibilities range from recommendations on City government matters and community interests to identifying opportunities, challenges and solutions to conducting special activities. The commissions are Audit, Beautification, Design Review, Economic Development, Education, Environmental, Financial, Athletic Club, Great Hall, Historic, Industrial Development, Neighborhood Preservation, Parks and Recreation, Personnel, Planning, Public Safety Education, Retirement Plan Administration, Other Postemployment Benefits, Senior Citizens, and Telecommunications. The boards are Zoning Appeals, Industrial Development and Library.

Education

Public schools
Germantown is served by two school districts, Shelby County Schools and Germantown Municipal School District.

Elementary Schools:
Farmington Elementary School, Forest Hill Elementary School, Dogwood Elementary School, Riverdale Elementary K-8 School (GMSD) and Germantown Elementary School (SCS)

Middle School:
Houston Middle School, Riverdale Elementary K-8 School (GMSD) and Germantown Middle School (SCS)

High School:
Houston High School (GMSD) In 2015, Houston High School was rated by The Washington Post as one of America's Most Challenging High Schools.
Germantown High School (SCS) Germantown High School is an International Baccalaureate School, Blue Ribbon School, and is one of the largest high schools in the state of Tennessee, rated as a Reward School in Tennessee for Growth and Achievement measured by perfect scores of 5 each of the past 5 years.

Jason Manuel, former principal of Houston Middle School, is Superintendent of Germantown Municipal Schools.  The School Board consists of 5 at large elected positions.

Germantown Elementary, Middle, and High School remain with the Shelby County Schools district, although they are located within the borders of the city of Germantown and continue to serve a large proportion of Germantown K-12 students as well as students from unincorporated Shelby County.

Private schools
 Daybreak Specialized School
 Evangelical Christian School
 Farmington Presbyterian 
 Madonna Learning Center
 Our Lady Of Perpetual Help Catholic School (preschool – 8th grade)
 St. George's Independent School
 The Bodine School
 The Phoenix School for Creative Learning
 Union University – Germantown

Demographics

2020 census

As of the 2020 United States Census, there were 41,333 people, 14,696 households, and 11,682 families residing in the city.

2010 census
As of the 2010 census, there were 38,844 people, 14,910 households, and 11,750 families residing in the city, with 15,536 housing units. The racial makeup of the city was 89.54% White, 3.57% Black, 0.21% Native American, 5.15% Asian, 0.02% Pacific Islander, 0.42% from other races, and 1.07% from two or more races. Hispanic or Latino of any race were 1.89% of the population.

There were 14,910 households, out of which 32.2% had children under the age of 18 living with them, 69.5% were married couples living together, 6.4% had a female householder with no husband present, 2.2% had a male householder with no wife present, and 21.9% were non-families. 19.7% of all households were made up of individuals, and 9.0% had someone living alone who was 65 years of age or older. The average household size was 2.60 and the average family size was 3.00.

In the city, the population was spread out, with 26.2% under the age of 20, 3.5% from 20 to 24, 19.2% from 25 to 44, 35.1% from 45 to 64, and 16.0% who were 65 years of age or older. The median age was 45.7 years. There were 18,800 males, of whom 14,023 were over the age of 18. There were 20,044 females, of whom 15,447 were over the age of 18.

The median income for a household in the city according to the 2010 census was $112,979, and the median income for a family was $127,216. Males had a median income of $93,401 versus $54,592 for females. The per capita income for the city was $54,157. About 1.9% of families and 2.9% of the population were below the poverty line, including 2.8% of those under age 18 and 2.2% of those age 65 or over.

Amenities

A total of 27 parks allow for a park within walking distance of every residence. The community has more than 700 acres of parkland. More than 11.4 miles of greenway links parkland and neighborhoods.

The Community Library was constructed in 1996 and the Regional History and Genealogy Center opened in FY07.

The Germantown Performing Arts Centre (GPAC) is an acoustically-perfect 800-seat theater featuring top artists from around the world.

The Germantown Athletic Club is a 118,000 square foot indoor athletic complex that opened in 1989 and expanded in 2003 to include two outdoor pools.

The Great Hall & Conference Center is an 8,000 square feet rental facility space for accommodation of meetings, weddings and receptions.

The Commissary is a Memphis-style barbecue restaurant located in "Old Germantown."

Churches
 Cumberland Presbyterian Church of Germantown
 Faith Presbyterian Church (EPC)
 Farmington Presbyterian Church (PCUSA)
 Forest Hill Baptist Church
 Forest Hill Church of Christ
 Germantown Baptist Church
 Germantown Church of Christ
 Germantown Presbyterian Church (PCUSA)
 Germantown United Methodist Church
 Grace Evangelical Church
 Our Lady of Perpetual Help Catholic Church
 Riveroaks Reformed Presbyterian Church (PCA)
 St. George's Episcopal Church

Notable people

Notable celebrities who currently reside or have previously resided in Germantown include:
 Kennedy Baker, Artistic gymnast, was born in Germantown.
 Chris Bell, co-founder of the highly influential band Big Star, was from a prominent Germantown family 
 Bobby Bland, singer-songwriter, band leader
 Matt Cain, pitcher for the San Francisco Giants
 John Daly, professional golfer
 Kallen Esperian, soprano, Metropolitan Opera
 Marc Gasol, NBA player with the local Memphis Grizzlies, moved to Germantown as a teenager with his parents after older brother Pau was drafted by the Grizzlies. Their parents still live in Germantown.
 David Gossett, professional golfer
 Hamed Haddadi, NBA player 
 Austin Hollins, professional basketball player and son of Lionel Hollins
 Lionel Hollins, professional basketball player, former Memphis Grizzlies head coach 
 Olivia Holt, actress
 Tim Howard, US National Soccer Team goalkeeper
 Paul Maholm, Atlanta Braves pitcher 
 Mickey Callaway, professional baseball player and coach
 Bob Melvin, manager of the Oakland Athletics 
 Cindy Parlow, US Women's National Soccer Team member and two-time Olympic gold medal winner (1996 and 2004)
 Chris Parnell, former member of the cast of Saturday Night Live
 Missi Pyle, Screen Actors Guild Awards nominated actress 
 Elliot Perry, professional basketball player
 Loren Roberts, professional golfer
 Steven Seagal, actor
 Todd Starnes, conservative columnist, commentator, author and radio host.
 Melanie Smith, U.S. Equestrian Team member, gold medal winner, 1984 Olympics 
 Ben Spies, former World Super Bike champion and Moto GP racer
 Michael Stern, conductor
 Kevin Swindell, NASCAR driver
 Sammy Swindell, Hall of Fame sprint car driver
 Joe Theismann, former NFL quarterback
 Julien Baker, indie rock singer
 Phil Irwin, former Major League Baseball pitcher
 Tony Williams, former NFL defensive tackle

Miscellaneous statistics

Fire Protection:
Number of Stations - 4,
Number of Regular Firefighters - 71,
Number of Volunteer Firefighters - 25,
Insurance Service Office Rating - Class I

Police Protection:
Number of Regular Police Officers - 108,
Number of Reserve Police Officers - 30

Recreation and Culture:
Number of Parks - 27,
Acreage - 748,
Number of Libraries - 2,
Volumes - 143,520

Water System:
Number of Consumers - 13,479,
Miles of Water Main - 208,
Well Capacity - 25 million gallons per day,
Treatment Plant Capacity  - 25 million gallons per day,
Storage Capacity - 7.875 million gallons,
Average Daily Consumption - 7.5 million gallons per day,
Peak Day Pumpage - 15.120 million gallons

Sewer System:
Number of Consumers  - 13,270,
Miles of Sewer Main - 211,
Treatment - Provided by City of Memphis

City partnerships
  Königs Wusterhausen

References

Further reading
 "An FAQ for Shelby Schools plans at Germantown schools it will retain ." Memphis Commercial Appeal. January 16, 2014.

External links
 
 
 Germantown News , weekly local newspaper
 Germantown news page at commercialappeal.com

 
Cities in Tennessee
Cities in Shelby County, Tennessee
Memphis metropolitan area
Populated places established in 1825